Bezuidenhout may refer to:

Places
Bezuidenhout, neighborhood of The Hague, the Netherlands
Bombing of the Bezuidenhout, World War II bombing of the neighborhood by the Royal Air Force
Bezuidenhouts Pass, mountain pass in KwaZulu-Natal province, South Africa 
Bezuidenhout Valley, suburb of Johannesburg, South Africa

People
Alicia Bezuidenhout (b. 1967), South African cricketer
Bernadine Bezuidenhout (b. 1993), South African cricketer
Carl Bezuidenhout (b. 1986), South African rugby union player
Christiaan Bezuidenhout (b. 1994), South African golfer
Christo Bezuidenhout (b. 1970), South African rugby union player
Cornelis Frederik Bezuidenhout (1773–1815), Cape Colony rebel whose death led to the Slachter's Nek Rebellion
Dawid Bezuidenhout (1935–1998), South West African politician
Ertjies Bezuidenhout (1955–2012), South African cyclist
Heino Bezuidenhout (b. 1997), South African rugby union player
Kristian Bezuidenhout (b. 1979), Australian pianist
Martin Bezuidenhout (b. 1989), South African footballer
Ryan Bezuidenhout (b. 1986), Zimbabwean cricketer
Simon Bezuidenhout (b. 1946), South African cricketer 
Steve Bezuidenhout (b. 1957), Namibian politician
Stoof Bezuidenhout (b. 1986), South African rugby union player

Fictional characters
Evita Bezuidenhout, fictional character played by Pieter-Dirk Uys